Bikhakhanim (d. after 1419), was the reigning princess of a small polity located on the Taman Peninsula in southern Russia.

She may have been of Circassian, Georgian, or Cuman origin. The Russian historian F. K. Brun, suggests that the name of the princess might not have been "Bikhakhanim," but "Bikhakhatun," and that, if so, she was the daughter of the Georgian prince Beka II Jakeli (died  1391), the ruler of Samtskhe and Klarjeti.

However, "Beki" means "Ruling Woman" in Mongolian and "Khanim" was the Medieval title of a female patrilineal descendant of Genghis Khan (equivalent to "Khan" for a male). 1419 was the year that the sons of Tokhtamysh Khan of the Golden Horde killed his rival Edigu the Khan of the Nogai Horde as a continuation of the Tokhtamysh–Timur war and reestablished control over the region.

Bikhakhanim was married in 1419 to the Genoese Jew Simeone de Guizolfi, who through this marriage became ruler of that country under Genoese overlordship. One of his heirs, Zacharias de Guizolfi, was still reigning in 1482.

See also
Gazaria
Ghisolfi
Tmutarakan

Notes

References
Brosset, Marie-Félicité. Hist. de la Géorgie.
Brun, F. K. Trudy Pervago Archeologickeskago Syezda v Moskve, 1869, ii. 386
Löwe, Richard. Die Reste der Germanen am Schwarzen Meere, p. 42, Halle, 1896.
Rosenthal, Herman. "Bikhakhanim". Jewish Encyclopedia. Funk and Wagnalls, 1901-1906.

15th-century deaths
15th-century women rulers
15th-century people from Georgia (country)
Year of birth unknown
Russian princesses
15th-century Russian princesses
15th-century Russian people
15th-century Russian women